God Is in the House is the fifth album in the live praise and worship series of contemporary worship music by Hillsong Church. It is also the first Hillsong Album where Darlene Zschech was Worship Pastor.  The album was recorded live at the Hills Entertainment Centre. The album reached No. 40 on the Billboard Top Contemporary Christian Albums Chart.

Track listing
 "God Is in the House" (Russell Fragar & Darlene Zschech) 
 "Joy in the Holy Ghost" (Fragar) 
 "Steppin' Out" (Steve McPherson) 
 "My Heart Sings Praises" (Fragar) 
 "And That My Soul Knows Very Well" (Zschech & Fragar) 
 "Jesus, What a Beautiful Name" (Tanya Riches) 
 "Let the Peace of God Reign" (Zschech) 
 "I Give You My Heart" (Reuben Morgan) 
 "Walking in the Light" (Zschech) 
 "Your People Sing Praises" (Fragar) 
 "I Believe the Promise" (Fragar) 
 "Thank You, Lord" (Dennis Jernigan) 
 "Lord of the Heavens" (Lucy Fisher) 
 "I Will Run to You" (Zschech) 
 "God Is in the House" (reprise)

Band 

 Darlene Zschech - worship leader
 Erica Crocker - vocals
 Rob Eastwood - vocals
 Lucy Fisher - vocals
 Donia Gandjou - vocals
 Craig Gower - keyboards, vocals
 Scott Haslem - vocals
 Steve McPherson - vocals, electric guitar 
 Lisa Young - vocals
 Russell Fragar - music director, piano
 David Moyse - electric guitar
 Ian Fisher - bass guitar
 Rick Peteriet - drums
 Chris Milne - percussion
 David Schenk - additional percussion
 Paul Thompson - additional percussion
 Raymond Floro - additional percussion
 Karen Packer - tenor saxophone
 Cathy Coluccio - alto saxophone
 Megan Howard - alto saxophone
 Renee Boland - alto saxophone
 Cathy Coluccio - soprano saxophone
 Mark Gregory - trumpet
 Peter King - trumpet
 Ruth Grant - Hillsong choir conductor
 Julia Beaumont - Hillsong Kidz choir conductor
 Amour Mah - Hillsong Kidz choir conductor

References 

1996 live albums
1996 video albums
Live video albums
Hillsong Music live albums
Hillsong Music video albums